The 2005 Central American and Caribbean Championships in athletics  were held at the Thomas Robinson Stadium in Nassau, Bahamas, between 8–11 July 2005.

Medal summary

Men's events

Women's events

† = non-championship event

Medal table

Participating nations

 (2)
 (4)
 (2)
 (43)
 (19)
 (1)
 (6)
 (6)
 (5)
 (67)
 (3)
 (24)
 (4)
 (12)
 (1)
 (14)
 (45)
 (22)
 (2)
 (5)
 (26)
 (10)
 (1)
 (2)
 (6)
 (5)
 (26)
 (7)
 (4)

See also
2005 in athletics (track and field)

References

External links
Detailed results – ATHLECAC
Men Results – GBR Athletics
Women Results – GBR Athletics

Central American and Caribbean Championships in Athletics
Central American and Caribbean Championships
Central American and Caribbean Championships
International athletics competitions hosted by the Bahamas